The Rural Municipality of Chesterfield No. 261 is a rural municipality (RM) in the Canadian province of Saskatchewan within Census Division No. 8 and  Division No. 3.

History 
The RM of Chesterfield No. 261 incorporated as a rural municipality on December 9, 1912.

Geography 
The southern boundary of the RM is along the South Saskatchewan River. The largest lake is Cabri Lake and the Mantario Hills are found in the western part of the RM. Within the hills is the Mantario Hills (SK 047) Important Bird Area (IBA) of Canada, which is a significant staging area for Canadian geese and nesting area for the ferruginous hawk. The Mantario Wildlife Management Unit is also found within the hills.

Communities and localities 
The following urban municipalities are surrounded by the RM.

Towns
 Eatonia

Villages

The following unincorporated communities are within the RM.

Organized hamlets
 Mantario
 Laporte

Localities
 Cuthbert
 Eyre

Demographics 

Attractions 
 Great Wall of Saskatchewan
 Cabri Lake Effigy

Government 
The RM of Chesterfield No. 261 is governed by an elected municipal council and an appointed administrator that meets on the second Tuesday of every month. The reeve of the RM is Karrie Derouin while its administrator is Tosha McCubbing. The RM's office is located in Eatonia.

Transportation 
 Canadian National Railway
 Saskatchewan Highway 21
 Saskatchewan Highway 44
 Saskatchewan Highway 635
 Estuary Ferry

See also 
List of rural municipalities in Saskatchewan

References 

C